Luitré (Gallo: Lutraé) is a former commune in the Ille-et-Vilaine department in Brittany in northwestern France. On 1 January 2019, it was merged into the new commune Luitré-Dompierre.

Amenities: Pharmacy, Doctor, Mairie, small Post Office, carwash, Automat laundry, Technique Controle - repair garage, boulangerie, charcuterie, bar, public toilets, fishing lake

Population
Inhabitants of Luitré are called Luitréens in French.

See also
Communes of the Ille-et-Vilaine department

References

External links

Former communes of Ille-et-Vilaine
Populated places disestablished in 2019